McCarten is a surname. Notable people with the surname include:

Anthony McCarten (born 1961), New Zealand writer and playwright
James McCarten (born 1990), English footballer
John McCarten (1911–1974), American writer, film critic and theatre critic
Matt McCarten (born 1959), New Zealand politician
Vincent McCarten (1913–1993), New Zealand cricketer

See also
McCartan